Isetskoe may refer to:

 Isetskoe (Sverdlovsk Oblast), a village in the southern part of the Sverdlovsk Oblast
 Isetskoe (Tyumen Oblast), a village in the Tyumen Oblast
 Isetskoe (lake), a lake located 25 km from the city of Yekaterinburg, the source of the Iset River
 Isetskoe (beer), a brand of beer

See also
 Iset River, Western Siberia, Russia
 Isetsky (disambiguation)